Luis T. Romero (1854 in San Luis Obispo, California - November 19, 1893 in Boston, Massachusetts), was an American musician. As a boy he played the guitar and when he moved to Los Angeles, he continued his studies with Miguel S. Arrevalo. Later he moved to San Jose, California to perform and teach and while there began to published numerous works. Subsequently he moved to Boston and continued his teaching practice while establishing his performance career which led to publishing many of his original and arranged works with Jean White Publishing Co. of Boston.

See also

 Classical Guitarists

Notes

American classical guitarists
American male guitarists
1893 deaths
1854 births
19th-century American guitarists
19th-century American male musicians
19th-century classical musicians